Plane Island (Latin: Phalans Insula) also known as Piana or  andin Tunisian Arabicas  (Standard , al-Jazira al-Munbasita), is a flat, rocky island in the Mediterranean Sea roughly  off Cape Farina, Tunisia. It has a lighthouse.

History
Plane Island is possibly the "Terapse" or "Phalans Island" of ancient geographers.

During the Napoleonic Wars, an error in navigation caused Captain Charles Tyler to wreck the captured frigate L'Aigle on Plane Island in July 1798 while operating against the French and pirates in the area. All of the crew were saved, and Captain Tyler was not held liable for the loss.

After the establishment of French control over Tunisia, Ernest Cosson studied the plant life on Plane Island in May, 1888.

The Belgian ship Scheldepas ran aground off Plane Island on March 14, 1929. The crew was rescued by the British ship Tabarka. The Greek ship Michael L. Embricios ran aground on Plane Island on November 22, 1931. 30 crew were rescued by the German ship Alaya.

The sea lanes around Plane Island were mined by the Allies during the Second World War. As part of Operation Retribution, the Allied blockade of Axis attempts to flee from occupied Tunisia to Sicily, HMS Lookout captured 13 Germans and Italians off Plane Island on 13 May 1943. A little later, HMS Laforeyen route from repairs in Maltastopped by Plane Island, discovering 23 Axis soldiers and taking them prisoner.

Lighthouse
The island's lighthouse has the designation numbers ARLHS TUN-024, Admiralty E6414, and NGA 22056.

It was erected by the French colonial authorities in 1888. It is a square tower with white and red bands, rising from its keeper's house. Its red lantern remains in use.

Transportation
The island remains accessible only by boat. It is closed to the public.

Gallery

References

Citations

Bibliography
 . 
 .
 .
 .
 .
 

Islands of Tunisia
Lighthouses in Tunisia
Lighthouses completed in 1888